A hacksaw is a fine-tooth saw used for cutting materials such as metal or plastics.

Hacksaw may also refer to:

People
 Mary Cain (editor) (1904–1984), American newspaper editor, political activist, and gubernatorial candidate nicknamed "Hacksaw Mary"
 Lee Hamilton (sports), American sportscaster nicknamed "Hacksaw"
 Jack "Hacksaw" Reynolds (born 1947), American former National Football League player
 Sam Tuitupou (born 1982), New Zealand rugby union player nicknamed "Hacksaw"
 Jim Duggan (born 1954), American professional wrestler known by the ring name "Hacksaw"
 Butch Reed (born 1954), American professional wrestler also known as "Hacksaw"

Other uses
 Hacksaw, a 1971/72 TV movie starring Tab Hunter
 Hacksaw, a 2020 found footage horror film

Lists of people by nickname